Banksia Park may refer to:
 Banksia Park, South Australia, a northeastern suburb of Adelaide
 Banksia Park (Victoria), a park on the banks of the Yarra River east of Melbourne